Jazz Messages is a 1957 LP re-issue and compilation of tracks by (i) the Clifford Brown Ensemble and (ii) The Jazz Messengers with Art Blakey. It was released on Jazztone Records (catalog #J-1281).

Comments 
"Ritual" – For the purpose of improving his art, Blakey, in 1947, worked his way over to Nigeria on a ship, and, while there, visited, Ghana. He stayed for a little over a year. Later, in the New York Jazz scene, Blakey became influential in raising awareness of African-based percussion. Among other things, he composed "Ritual" out of inspiration from his experiences in Africa. Jazz critic Norman Weinstein opined that "Ritual" was one of several projects where Blakey showed an interest in African diasporic musical connections, expressed in "quasi-Afro-Cuban and Afro-Caribbean terms."

"Daahoud," sometimes spelled "Dawud," means "David" in Arabic. Brown named the composition after Talib Dawud, a trumpet-playing acquaintance – with Dizzy and Lee Morgan – in Philadelphia from the early 1950s.

Brown, on June 26, 1954, married LaRue Anderson (maiden; 1933–2005). He called her "Joy Spring," and, in her honor, composed a piece in her name in 1954. They had been introduced by Max Roach.

Track listing 
 Jazztone re-issue

 Matrix – Side 1 (printed on label): 
 Matrix – Side 2 (printed on label): 

 Original releases

 Personnel

 Clifford Brown – trumpet
 Stu Williamson – valve trombone
 Zoot Sims – tenor sax
 Bob Gordon – bari sax
 Russ Freeman – piano
 Joe Mondragon – bass (August 12 session)
 Carson Smith – bass (September 8 session)
 Shelly Manne – drums

 Personnel

 Jackie McLean – alto sax
 Bill Hardman – trumpet
 Sam Dockery – piano
 Spanky DeBrest – bass
 Art Blakey – drums

Notes and references

Notes

References

Additional reading 
 Clifford Brown: The Life and Art of the Legendary Jazz Trumpeter, by Nick Catalano, Oxford University Press (2000; paperback 2001), p. 129; 

Art Blakey albums
Clifford Brown albums
1957 albums